Fumio Takashina (born 1911, date of death unknown) was a Japanese diver. He competed in the men's 3 metre springboard event at the 1928 Summer Olympics.

References

External links

1911 births
Year of death missing
Japanese male divers
Olympic divers of Japan
Divers at the 1928 Summer Olympics
Place of birth missing
20th-century Japanese people